Frank Stephenson (born 3 October 1959) is a Moroccan-born American automobile designer who has worked for Ford, BMW, Mini, Ferrari, Maserati, Fiat, Lancia, Alfa Romeo,  and McLaren.

Motor Trend magazine has called him "one of the most influential automotive designers of our time". Stephenson has created a YouTube channel under his name, the first video series being the 'How I Designed...'series in April 2020 and as of March 2022 his channel has gained over 200 thousand subscribers with over 12 million views.

Biography 
Frank Stephenson (3 October 1959), was born and raised in Casablanca, Morocco to a Norwegian father and a Spanish mother. At the age of 11 his family moved to Istanbul, Turkey followed by two years in Madrid, Spain where he graduated from high school. After high school Stephenson spent six years competing professionally in motocross. His passion for drawing and automobiles since his youth led him to study automotive design at Art Center College of Design in Pasadena, California from 1982 to 1986. Stephenson has been the director of design for MINI, Ferrari, Maserati, Fiat, Lancia, Alfa Romeo, and McLaren before moving on to Lilium Aviation to lead the design team creating flying taxis, known as eVTOL aircraft, as well as being Design Master at Suning Intelligent Technology, a major Chinese technology company. Additionally, he is the design director of his independent design studio, Frank Stephenson Design, based in the UK, an award-winning team that designs and collaborates with companies worldwide seeking success through creative innovation. Stephenson speaks English, Italian, German, and Spanish fluently and is an international speaker on many design-related and motivational subjects and has been listed in Debrett's People of Today since 2010.

Design career 
Stephenson’s design career spans several of Europe's best-known automotive companies. He began at Ford's design studio in Cologne, Germany, where he was asked to submit designs for some distinctive features on the Ford Escort RS Cosworth. While Stephen Harper "did the bulk of the design", Stephenson proposed an innovative, third functional spoiler that did not make it into production. He later moved to BMW where he spent 11 years, eventually leading to an appointment as Chief Designer. His design of the new MINI Cooper launched at the Paris Auto Show in 2000 led to the award-winning rebirth of the brand and a new generation of MINI models. In 2003 the MINI Cooper was the first European car to win the North American Car of the Year award in 2003.  Also while at BMW, Stephenson designed the first BMW SUV, the BMW X5 (E53).

In July 2002, Stephenson was appointed the first Director of Ferrari-Maserati Concept Design and Development in Maranello and Modena, Italy. His work with this department included the design of the Maserati GranSport, Maserati MC12, Ferrari FXX and Ferrari F430. His work with this department included the design of Pininfarina's work on the Maserati Quattroporte, Maserati GranTurismo and Ferrari 612 Scaglietti. Stephenson's success with the Ferrari and Maserati designs led to his appointment as head of Fiat, Lancia, and the Commercial Vehicle Styling Centre in Turin, Italy in 2006. He was tasked with rebuilding the struggling Fiat brand, where he directed the styling of the Punto, Bravo and translated Roberto Giolito's 2004 Fiat Trepiùno concept into the production 500, Punto and Bravo.  In 2007 he was made Head of Centro Stile Alfa Romeo design.

Stephenson left the Italian group in April 2008 to become Design Director at McLaren Automotive where he created a new design language and oversaw the design of the new range of McLarens, MP4-12C, P1, 675LT, 570S and 720S. While at McLaren he drew inspiration for the P1 partially from a sailfish that he saw when on holiday in Miami.

Stephenson left McLaren Automotive in 2017 and was rumoured to make a return to the BMW Group to head the design team at MINI. The rumours turned out to be unfounded; upon leaving McLaren, Stephenson founded his own design studio, Frank Stephenson Design Consultancy.
From May 2018 to November 2019, Stephenson was head of Product Design at the German aviation company Lilium and Design Master of Suning Smart Technology. Stephenson continues to work on many different cross-industry design projects, products and design solutions.  
He is dedicated to taking on design challenges that will be game-changers in various industries that have the greatest positive impact on the lives of many.
In 2019 a film documentary about his work and career, titled Chasing Perfect, produced by Lionsgate and Salon Pictures, and directed by Helena Coan, was released globally.

Design style 
Stephenson says that he looks everywhere for inspiration and is always sketching. He adds that just walking down the street one can find inspiration from so many things. Stephenson also says that he looks to the animal kingdom for design, adopting what's termed biomimicry for his design inspiration. His stated goal is to "find the principles in nature that make organisms be successful in their environment".

Stephenson's design process progresses from sketch pad to computer graphics, to clay models, and finally to prototype models. He says the advantage of working with clay models is that you can see and feel the designed surfaces in three dimensions, embedding the product with the human touch. He credits curiosity, research, and innovation as key drivers to his design values.

References

External links 

 

1959 births
People from Casablanca
Living people
American automobile designers
BMW people
Ferrari people
Maserati people
Fiat people
Alfa Romeo people
American people of Spanish descent
McLaren people
American expatriates in the United Kingdom